The list of shipwrecks in 1806 includes ships sunk, foundered, wrecked, grounded, or otherwise lost during 1806.

January

2 January

4 January

6 January

8 January

9 January

10 January

11 January

12 January

14 January

15 January

16 January

17 January

18 January

20 January

22 January

23 January

24 January

25 January

26 January

27 January

28 January

29 January

30 January

Unknown date

February

2 February

3 February

4 February

6 February

7 February

9 February

11 February

13 February

14 February

15 February

16 February

17 February

18 February

19 February

21 February

23 February

25 February

26 February

27 February

28 February

Unknown date

March

1 March

3 March

4 March

7 March

9 March

10 March

11 March

12 March

13 March

15 March

16 March

17 March

18 March

19 March

22 March

24 March

Unknown date

April

1 April

4 April

6 April

8 April

9 April

11 April

12 April

13 April

15 April

17 April

19 April

20 April

22 April

23 April

27 April

30 April

Unknown date

May

2 May

5 May

7 May

9 May

10 May

12 May

17 May

20 May

22 May

24 May

Unknown date

June

4 June

6 June

10 June

11 June

13 June

14 June

16 June

17 June

21 June

28 June

29 June

30 June

Unknown date

July

7 July

9 July

12 July

13 July

15 July

16 July

18 July

20 July

26 July

27 July

28 July

31 July

Unknown date

August

2 August

4 August

6 August

8 August

10 August

14 August

16 August

20 August

21 August

22 August

23 August

24 August

25 August

27 August

29 August

31 August

Unknown date

September

2 September

3 September

4 September

5 September

6 September

7 September

9 September

12 September

13 September

14 September

15 September

16 September

18 September

26 September

27 September

30 September

Unknown date

October

1 October

4 October

6 October

8 October

9 October

10 October

12 October

16 October

17 October

18 October

20 October

22 October

23 October

25 October

26 October

30 October

31 October

Unknown date

November

2 November

3 November

4 November

5 November

7 November

10 November

17 November

18 November

22 November

26 November

27 November

29 November

30 November

Unknown date

December

1 December

2 December

3 December

7 December

8 December

10 December

11 December

12 December

13 December

14 December

15 December

17 December

18 December

19 December

21 December

22 December

24 December

25 December

26 December

29 December

30 December

Unknown date

Unknown date

References

1806